The William Woollett Jr. Aquatics Center is an aquatics venue located in Irvine, California, United States. The City of Irvine operates year-round municipal programs in aquatic facility. The center provides a venue for local, regional and national competitive events and features two 50 meter pools and a 25-yard instruction pool. Aquatics activities include a combination of instructional, educational, recreational and competitive programs offered by the City and a number of local nonprofit aquatic organizations. During the 1984 Summer Olympics, it hosted the swimming portion of the modern pentathlon event. It has since hosted the 2010 Pan Pacific Swimming Championships, the United States Swimming National Championships in 2005, 2006, 2010, 2014, and 2018, and the 2015 USA Water Polo National Junior Olympics. The facility, originally named the Heritage Park Aquatics Center, was renamed after the City of Irvine's first City Manager and rebuilt beginning in 2003.

References
1984 Summer Olympics official report. Volume 1. Part 1. pp. 140–3.
Yahoo! profile

External links
 City of Irvine | Aquatics Centers

Venues of the 1984 Summer Olympics
Olympic modern pentathlon venues
Sports venues in Irvine, California
Swimming venues in California